The Urban-Brookings Tax Policy Center, typically shortened to the Tax Policy Center (TPC), is a nonpartisan think tank based in Washington D.C. A joint venture of the Urban Institute and the Brookings Institution, it aims to provide independent analyses of current and longer-term tax issues, and to communicate its analyses to the public and to policymakers. TPC combines national specialists in tax, expenditure, budget policy, and microsimulation modeling to concentrate on five overarching areas of tax policy: fair, simple and efficient taxation, social policy in the tax code, business tax reform, long-term implications of tax and budget choices, and state tax issues.

History
In 2002, tax specialists who had served in the Ronald Reagan, George H. W. Bush, and Bill Clinton administrations established the Tax Policy Center to provide analysis of tax issues.  The following year TPC developed a tax simulation model to analyze the federal income tax and proposals to change it.  That model has evolved to incorporate new and additional data, changes in federal tax law, and other aspects of the tax system and the economy.

Staff
Tracy Gordon replaced Mark Mazur as the Robert C. Pozen Director of the Tax Policy Center in March, 2022, after serving as Acting Director from January 2021.  Bill Gale, Arjay and Frances Miller Chair in Federal Economic Policy at the Brookings Institution, serves as Co-Director. Leonard Burman was director of TPC from 2013 to 2017. Donald Marron, former member of the President's Council of Economic Advisers and former acting director of the Congressional Budget Office, was Director of TPC from 2010 to 2013. The center's TaxVox blog is led by tax correspondent Howard Gleckman.

Analyses
TPC publications examine the impacts of a variety of tax issues. A 2012 report outlined the then-presidential candidates' tax proposals and analyzed their distributional and revenue impacts. Other studies have examined the 2001-2006 tax cuts, the alternative minimum tax, the impact of tax provisions on low-income families, and tax incentives for education. An extensive collection of tables provides estimates of the impact of current taxes as well as the implications of proposals to change tax law.

TPC representatives have testified before the United States Congress regarding tax and health care reforms.  TaxVox, the TPC blog, discusses current tax and budget issues.   The Tax Policy Briefing Book is an on-line collection of short articles that explain a range of tax issues.  Entries offer background information, describe key elements of the tax system, propose changes to improve the tax system, and provide information on state and local tax policy.  The center has also collected various data tables in "Tax Facts" which cover aspects of the U.S. tax system, ranging from tax rates and revenues collected to changes over time in state and local tax collections. TPC's State and Local Finance Data Query System (SLF-DQS) provides tools with which users can create their own tables related to state and local finances based on data from the Census of Governments State and Local Finance series.

Funding
TPC is funded by individuals, corporations, trade groups, and foundations including the Ford Foundation, the Bill and Melinda Gates Foundation, and the Rockefeller Foundation.

See also
 Center on Budget and Policy Priorities
 Citizens for Tax Justice
 Council on State Taxation
 Institute on Taxation and Economic Policy
 Tax Foundation

References

External links
 

Nonpartisan organizations in the United States
Political and economic think tanks in the United States
Tax reform in the United States
Organizations based in Washington, D.C.
Brookings Institution